K.R. Ramalingam was an Indian politician and former Member of the Legislative Assembly. He was elected to the Tamil Nadu legislative assembly as a Dravida Munnetra Kazhagam candidate from Tuticorin constituency in the 1971 elections. He was called KRR by his followers, and lived a very simple lifestyle. He died on 13 March 2013 in Thoothukudi.

References 

Dravida Munnetra Kazhagam politicians
Members of the Tamil Nadu Legislative Assembly
Year of birth missing